Bobby Jack Floyd (December 8, 1929 — June 27, 2012) was a fullback in the National Football League.

Biography
Floyd was born in Paris, Texas.

Career
He played at Texas Christian University.

Floyd was drafted by the Green Bay Packers in the fifteenth round of the 1952 NFL Draft and played that season with the team. The following season, he played with the Chicago Bears.

See also
List of Green Bay Packers players

References

1929 births
2012 deaths
People from Paris, Texas
Players of American football from Texas
American football fullbacks
TCU Horned Frogs football players
Green Bay Packers players
Chicago Bears players